Madhuca pallida is a tree in the family Sapotaceae. The specific epithet pallida means "pale in colour", referring to the leaves.

Description
The bark is dark brown. Inflorescences bear up to eight bright yellowish-green flowers.

Distribution and habitat
Madhuca pallida is native to Sumatra and Borneo. Its habitat is mixed dipterocarp forest to  altitude.

Conservation
Madhuca pallida has been assessed as near threatened on the IUCN Red List. The species is threatened by logging and conversion of land for palm oil plantations.

References

pallida
Trees of Sumatra
Trees of Borneo
Plants described in 1885
Taxa named by Charles Baehni
Taxa named by William Burck